Thornton Ward Estate is a historic rural estate located at 1387 U.S. Route 40 south-southeast of Toledo, Illinois. The main building on the estate, an Italianate house, was constructed circa 1875 by the Ward family. The two-story brick home has a symmetrical front with two windows on each story on either side of the entry. The entrance features a double door topped by an arched transom; a single panel door is located directly above the entrance on the second floor. The home's hipped roof features a small gable above the entrance and is topped by a widow's walk. The estate also includes a section of the original National Road.

The estate was added to the National Register of Historic Places on December 4, 2001.

References

Houses completed in 1875
Houses in Cumberland County, Illinois
Houses on the National Register of Historic Places in Illinois
Italianate architecture in Illinois
U.S. Route 40
National Register of Historic Places in Cumberland County, Illinois